The year 1763 in architecture involved some significant architectural events and new buildings.

Events
 April 3 – Foundation stone of the church of La Madeleine, Paris laid; the original design, commissioned in 1757 from Pierre Contant d'Ivry, will not be completed.
 Chapel for Clare Hall in the University of Cambridge (England) designed by Sir James Burrough.

Buildings and structures

Buildings opened

 May 14 – Nuovo Teatro Pubblico in Bologna, designed by Antonio Galli Bibiena, opened.
 July 24 – Požega Cathedral, Požega, Croatia, consecrated.
 December 2 – Touro Synagogue, Newport, Rhode Island, designed by Peter Harrison, dedicated.
 St Cecilia's Hall in Edinburgh, Scotland, designed by Robert Mylne, opened.

Buildings completed
 Börringe Castle, Sweden.
 Church of St. Mary Magdalene, Croome, Worcestershire, England, designed by "Capability Brown" (exterior) and Robert Adam (interior).
 Clérigos Church tower, Porto, Portugal.
 St. Mary's Roman Catholic Church (Philadelphia), Pennsylvania.
 Villa Albani in Rome, designed by Carlo Marchionni, is substantially completed.
 Donnington Grove in Berkshire, England, designed by John Chute, is built.
 Theater am Kärntnertor in Vienna, rebuilding by Nicolò Pacassi is completed.
 Present Use Storehouse (No. 11), Portsmouth Historic Dockyard, England, is built.

Births
 August 8 – Charles Bulfinch, first native-born American to practice architecture as a profession (died 1844)

Deaths
 February 2 – Emmanuel Héré de Corny, French court architect to Stanisław Leszczyński at Nancy (born 1705)
 September 12 – Johann Joseph Couven, German baroque architect (born 1701)

References

Architecture
Years in architecture
18th-century architecture